The 1969–70 season was Manchester United's 68th season in the Football League, and their 25th consecutive season in the top division of English football. Before the beginning of the season, on 4 June 1969, United manager Matt Busby stepped down as manager after 24 years as manager. McGuinness guided United to an eighth-place finish in his first season as manager, and they reached the semi-finals of both the FA Cup and the League Cup.

First Division

FA Cup

League Cup

Squad statistics

References

Manchester United F.C. seasons
Manchester United